Andover may refer to:

Places

Australia
Andover, Tasmania

Canada
 Andover Parish, New Brunswick
 Perth-Andover, New Brunswick

United Kingdom
 Andover, Hampshire, England
 RAF Andover, a former Royal Air Force station

United States
 Andover, Connecticut, a New England town
 Andover, Florida
 Andover, Illinois
 Andover, Iowa
 Andover, Kansas
 Andover, Maine, a New England town
 Andover, Massachusetts, a New England town
 Andover (CDP), Massachusetts, the main village in the town
 Andover, Minnesota
 Andover, Missouri
 Andover, New Hampshire, a New England town
 Andover, New Jersey, a borough
 Andover Township, New Jersey
 Andover, Ohio
 Andover, South Dakota
 Andover, Vermont, a New England town
 Andover, Virginia

Transportation
Andover railway station (England), in Andover, Hampshire, England
Andover Town railway station, a former station in Andover, Hampshire, England
Andover Road station in Micheldever, Hampshire, 15 km from Andover
Andover station (Delaware, Lackawanna and Western Railroad), a former station in Andover, New Jersey, US
Andover station (MBTA), in Andover, Massachusetts, US
Andover station (NJ Transit), in Andover, New Jersey, US

Other
 Phillips Academy Andover, a Massachusetts boarding school
 Andover Theological Seminary, now part of Andover Newton Theological School, Massachusetts
 Avro Andover, a British military transport aircraft of the 1920s
 Hawker Siddeley Andover, a British military transport aircraft
 Andover, Kansas Tornado Outbreak, a tornado in Kansas
 Duke of Andover, fictional character in The Black Moth, 1921 novel by Georgette Heyer
 Andover (film), a 2017 science fiction romantic comedy film
 Andover (horse)